Bogovina is a mining town located the municipality of Boljevac, eastern Serbia. As of 2011 census, it has a population of 1,151 inhabitants.

Bogovina grew around the underground brown coal mine opened in 1903. It reached its pinnacle in the mid-20th century, with the high demand for coal during the industrial growth of the country. With the reduction in coal production, the town has been experiencing gradual depopulation. , the Bogovina Coal Mine still employs 320 workers, but its destiny is uncertain due to the scheduled cessation of state subventions and likely closure of the "Resavica" mine complex.

Notable people
Ljubiša Avramelović "Brka", boxer, five times Serbian champion, two times Yugoslavian champion
Žika Nikolić, singer

See also
 List of mines in Serbia

References

External links
 Bogovina Coal Mine History 

Populated places in Zaječar District
Timok Valley
Coal mines in Serbia